S. Mohkam-ud-Din and Sons Bakers is a historic bakery located in Anarkali Bazaar, Lahore, Pakistan. It is known for cakes and Lady Harrison's finger biscuits.

History
S. Mohkam-ud-Din Bakery was founded on 1 January 1879 by Mohkamuddin. It was inaugurated by Lady Aitchison, the wife of Charles Umpherston Aitchison.

After the partition of India, another branch was opened in The Mall, Lahore.

References

1879 establishments in British India
Bakeries of Pakistan
Tourist attractions in Lahore